is a steel roller coaster at Nagashima Spa Land in Mie Prefecture, Japan. It was originally a wooden roller coaster known as  manufactured by Swiss company Intamin that operated from 1994 to 2018. It was refurbished by American company Rocky Mountain Construction, which replaced the ride's wooden track with steel track and modified the ride layout, including the addition of three inversions. The renovated ride reopened on March 28, 2019.

History

White Cyclone

Before White Cyclone's construction in 1994, there had been only one wooden roller coaster ever built in Japan. This roller coaster, Jupiter, opened in 1992—after the Japanese government relaxed height restrictions on wooden structures. Another wooden coaster, White Canyon, opened in 1994—the same year as White Cyclone. In 2013, the roller coasters Jupiter and White Cyclone were two of only four operating wooden roller coasters in Japan, and of only 13 operating wooden roller coasters in Asia.

White Cyclone was constructed of enough Alaskan timber to build nearly a thousand homes. The ride was particularly fast for a wooden roller coaster and featured many common elements such as helices, large drops and smaller bunny hills. The roller coaster had a double out-and-back track layout and used trains manufactured by the Philadelphia Toboggan Company. White Cyclone closed on January 28, 2018.

Hakugei

Rocky Mountain Construction refurbished the roller coaster using its patented I-Box Track technology. The ride's height and speed were increased and three inversions were added to the layout.

References

External links
 
 
 Hakugei at Rocky Mountain Construction

Roller coasters introduced in 1994
Roller coasters in Japan
Hybrid roller coasters